This is a list of all the  golfers who have played in the Walker Cup for the Great Britain and Ireland team through 2021. Joe Carr holds the record with eleven appearances.

Players

^ In the final team but did not play in any matches.
+ Selected for the team but withdrew and was replaced.

Ryder Cup players
The following 30 Great Britain and Ireland Walker Cup players have subsequently played in the Ryder Cup:

Peter Baker, Gordon Brand Jnr, Paul Casey, Clive Clark, Howard Clark, Andrew Coltart, Luke Donald, Norman Drew, Matt Fitzpatrick, Tommy Fleetwood, Stephen Gallacher, David Gilford, Pádraig Harrington, David Howell, Mark James, Michael King, Sandy Lyle, Graeme McDowell, Paul McGinley, Rory McIlroy, Colin Montgomerie, Peter Oosterhuis, Ronan Rafferty, Justin Rose, Andy Sullivan, Peter Townsend, Philip Walton, Paul Way, Danny Willett, Oliver Wilson.

See also
List of American Walker Cup golfers
Lists of golfers

References

Great Britain
Walker Cup, Great Britain
 Walker Cup
 Walker Cup
Walker Cup
Walker Cup
Golf